Rotherham Bridge crosses the River Don in central Rotherham, South Yorkshire.  It is known for its bridge chapel, considered the best preserved in England.

A document of 1385 refers to Bridgegate in the town, which implies that a previous bridge existed on the same site.  The road it carries was originally the main route from London to Richmond.  The current bridge was erected by 1483, when the Chapel of Our Lady of Rotherham Bridge was added.  It is of ashlar sandstone and is built on three piers, each with a cutwater.

John Leland, writing around 1540, described a "fair Stone Bridge of iiii arches" and "a Chapel of Stone well wrought".  The chapel was dissolved in 1547 and converted into first an almshouse, then the town gaol and finally a shop.  The bridge was altered in 1768–69 by John Platt, working for John Carr of York, but was restored to its original dimensions by Reginald Blomfield in 1927, when Chantry Bridge was built alongside.  The chapel was restored at the same time.

The bridge is Grade I listed and is a Scheduled Ancient Monument.

See also
Grade I listed buildings in South Yorkshire
Listed buildings in Rotherham (Boston Castle Ward)

References

Bridges completed in 1483
Bridges in South Yorkshire
Buildings and structures in Rotherham
Bridges over the River Don, South Yorkshire
Grade I listed buildings in South Yorkshire
Scheduled monuments in South Yorkshire
Grade I listed bridges